Punjab Youth Festival is a sports festival held annually in Punjab, Pakistan. Chief Minister of the Punjab Shahbaz Sharif inaugurated it on October 20, 2012. The opening ceremony was held on that day in the National Hockey Stadium, Lahore. During the ceremony, 42,813 students sang the National Anthem in what became a Guinness World Record (GWR) for the highest number of people to have ever sung a national anthem in a live gathering. The previous record had been held by India, in which fifteen thousand people had participated in an anthem singing. 

On 21 December 2013 member National Assembly Hamza Shahbaz Sharif and Provincial Minister for Sports & Youth Affairs Rana Mashhood Ahmed Khan unveiled the logo of Punjab Youth Festival 2014 at Gymnasium of Punjab Sports Board Lahore.

References

Further reading

External links 
 Punjab Youth Festival's official website

Sports competitions in Pakistan
Sport in Punjab, Pakistan
Festivals in Punjab, Pakistan
Youth festivals
Sports festivals in Pakistan
2012 establishments in Pakistan
Recurring events established in 2012